para-Ethoxyamphetamine, also known as 4-ethoxyamphetamine (4-ETA), is a psychoactive drug and research chemical of the phenethylamine and amphetamine chemical classes which is closely related to the infamous para-methoxyamphetamine (PMA). para-Ethoxyamphetamine has similar effects to PMA in animal studies, although with slightly weaker stimulant effects. Like PMA, it has prominent MAOI activity, and is likely to have similar dangers associated with its use.

See also
 para-Methoxyamphetamine (PMA)
 2,5-Dimethoxy-4-ethoxyamphetamine (MEM)
 2,5-Dimethoxy-4-propoxyamphetamine (MPM)

References

Substituted amphetamines
Serotonin releasing agents